Sometimes confused with his contemporary William Eyre (leveller)
William Eyre of Neston, Wiltshire (fl. 1642–1660), was a parliamentarian army officer and politician.

Eyre fought for the parliamentary cause in the English Civil War. He may have risen from the rank of captain of foot to colonel (the latter rank probably being held in the Wiltshire militia). On 29 November 1648 he was returned as the member of parliament for Chippenham and was admitted to the Rump Parliament on 15 January 1649. At the end of the Protectorate, the restored Rump commissioned him colonel of a regiment of foot previously commanded by John Lambert.  However, along with other officers who General George Monck believed to be unsympathetic to the restoration of the monarchy, he was relieved of his command.

Notes

References

Roundheads
English army officers
People from Corsham
Year of birth missing
Year of death missing
People from Wiltshire
Place of birth missing
English MPs 1648–1653